The 1992 Cleveland Browns season was the team's 43rd season with the National Football League.

NFL Draft

 1x09: FB Tommy Vardell
 Traded 2x36 and 5x121 to Dallas Cowboys for 2x52, 3x78, 6x163, 8x222, and 12x329
 2x52: WR Patrick Rowe
 3x65: DT Bill Johnson
 3x78: LB Gerald Dixon
 Traded 4th Rounder to Philadelphia Eagles for OL Ken Reeves
 Traded 6th Rounder and 8x222 to Tampa Bay Buccaneers for 6x143. Selected WR Rico Smith
 7x177: CB Selwyn Jones
 Traded 8th Rounder to New England Patriots for OL Freddie Childress
 9x233: CB Tim Hill
 10x260: DT Marcus Lowe
 11x289: WR Augustin Olobia
 12x316: QB Keithen McCant
 12x339: G Tim Simpson

Personnel

Staff

Roster

Schedule

Note: Intra-division opponents are in bold text.

Standings

References

External links 
 1992 Cleveland Browns at Pro Football Reference (Profootballreference.com)
 1992 Cleveland Browns Statistics at jt-sw.com
 1992 Cleveland Browns Schedule at jt-sw.com
 1992 Cleveland Browns at DatabaseFootball.com  

Cleveland
Cleveland Browns seasons
Cleveland